Durgam Chinnaiah is an Indian politician and a legislator of Telangana Legislature. He won from Bellampalli on Telangana Rashtra Samithi ticket.

References

People from Telangana
Living people
People from Adilabad
Telangana Rashtra Samithi politicians
Telangana MLAs 2014–2018
Year of birth missing (living people)
Telangana MLAs 2018–2023